Forde  may refer to:

 Forde (surname)
 Forde Abbey, Dorset, England
 Forde Inquiry, 1999 report on child abuse presented to the government of Queensland, Australia
 Forde, Australian Capital Territory, suburb in Canberra, Australia 
 Division of Forde, Electoral Division in Queensland, Australia
 Forde Ministry, thirty-second Australian Commonwealth ministry, 6–13 July 1945
 Seaforde, a village in County Down, Northern Ireland (named for a family called Forde)

See also
 Ford (disambiguation)
 Førde (disambiguation)
 Fforde